Ciudad Deportiva Fundación Rayo Vallecano is the training ground of Rayo Vallecano. It is located in Madrid.

Facilities
Ciudad Deportiva Stadium with a capacity of 2.000 seats, is the home stadium of Rayo Vallecano B, the reserve team of Rayo Vallecano.
4 artificial pitches.
1 mini grass pitch.
Service centre with gymnasium.

References

External links
 Rayo Vallecano
 Fundacion Rayo Vallecano
 Estadios de Espana

Rayo
Rayo Vallecano
Sports venues completed in 2010
Sports venues in Madrid